Underneath Acoustic is a live EP by Hanson recorded in July 2003 in Tulsa, Oklahoma.  Only a select group of Hanson.net fan club members were invited to the private show. The EP was only released on the Hanson.net store.

Track listing
All songs written by Isaac Hanson, Taylor Hanson and Zac Hanson; additional writers in parentheses.
 "Strong Enough to Break" (Greg Wells)
 "Deeper"
 "When You're Gone"
 "Misery"
 "Underneath" (Matthew Sweet)
 "Penny and Me"
 "Hey" (G. Wells)
 "Love Somebody to Know" (Stephen Lironi)"This Time Around" (hidden track)

Hanson (band) albums
2003 debut EPs
Live EPs
2003 live albums